Lyonesse is a country in Arthurian legend.

Lyonesse or Lyoness may also refer to:

 Lyonesse, an Arthurian character; see Lynette and Lyonesse
 The Lyonesse Trilogy, a high fantasy trilogy by Jack Vance
 Lyonesse, a fictional planet in the Foundation series by Isaac Asimov
 Lyonesse, a fictional underground kingdom of Deviants in Marvel Comics
 SS Lyonesse, a ship built in 1889 for the ferry service between Penzance and the Isles of Scilly

See also
 Lyoness, a shopping community
 Lyonnaise (disambiguation)